Antonietta Rudge (13 June 1885 – 14 July 1974) was a Brazilian pianist of international fame.

Early life 
Rudge was born in 1885, in São Paulo, to Anna Emília da Silva Telles and João Henrique Rudge. She was a descendant of the English settler John Rudge, from Stroud, who came to Brazil in the early 19th century.

Rudge demonstrated a talent for playing the piano since she was four years old. Her parents hired her a private teacher, the Frenchman Gabriel Giraudon. She debuted in a public piano concert in 1892, at age seven, at the Casa Levy hall.

She performed at São Paulo clubs, such as Clube Internacional and Clube Germânia, playing works by Beethoven. That time, Rudge was a pupil of Luigi Chiaffarelli. Rudge's repertoire also included Mozart's concertos, Chopin's sonatas and nocturnes, Bach's The Well-Tempered Clavier, Schumann, and Liszt's Hungarian Rhapsody no.6.

Career 

In 1907, Rudge started a two-year European tour, playing in England, Germany and France. Her performances were acclaimed, garnering her praise from artists like Isidor Philipp and Charles Widor. She toured Europe again  in 1911.

Back to Brazil, she did concerts in Brazilian capitals. In a concert in Rio de Janeiro in 1918, Rudge and Guiomar Novaes were praised by Arthur Rubinstein, who called them "brilliant".

Rudge played less frequently in public, dedicating herself to musical education. In 1927 she founded the Musical Conservatory in Santos.

In the 1930s and 1940s she recorded some 78rpm discs with performances of Wagner's Liebestod and Chopin's Barcarolle. Those recordings were reissued in 2000 in a CD.

Rudge died on 14 July 1974. Her body is buried at the Cemitério da Consolação.

Personal life 
In 1905, Antonietta Rudge married Charles Miller, known for introducing the game of football (soccer) to Brazil with whom she had two children. They divorced in 1925, and she started a relationship with Modernist poet Menotti del Picchia.

References 

1885 births
1974 deaths
Brazilian people of English descent
Brazilian classical pianists
Brazilian women pianists
Musicians from São Paulo
20th-century Brazilian musicians
20th-century classical pianists
Women classical pianists
20th-century women pianists